Erythrophysa transvaalensis (Bushveld red balloon) is a species of plant in the family Sapindaceae. It is a protected tree in South Africa. It is found in Botswana, South Africa, and Zimbabwe. Its range is disjunct however, so that suggestions have been made that its seeds were formerly employed as beads, which assisted its dispersal along ancient trade routes.

References

transvaalensis
Trees of Botswana
Flora of Zimbabwe
Protected trees of South Africa
Least concern plants
Taxonomy articles created by Polbot